Isognathus occidentalis is a moth of the  family Sphingidae.

Distribution
It is known from Venezuela, northern Brazil and French Guiana.

Description
It is similar to Isognathus excelsior but distinguishable by the pale brown underside of the abdomen. There are probably multiple generations per year.

Biology
The larvae have been recorded feeding on Himatanthus lancifolius. They have long tails and very colourful, suggesting they are unpalatable to birds.

References

Isognathus
Moths described in 1929